The University of Massachusetts Lowell (UMass Lowell and UML) is a public research university in Lowell, Massachusetts, with a satellite campus in Haverhill, Massachusetts. It is the northernmost member of the University of Massachusetts public university system and has been accredited by the New England Commission of Higher Education (NECHE) since 1975. With 1,110 faculty members and over 18,000 students, it is the largest university in the Merrimack Valley and the second-largest public institution in the state. It is classified among "R2: Doctoral Universities – High research activity".

The university offers 120 bachelor's degree, 43 master's degree, and 25 doctoral degree programs, including nationally recognized programs in engineering, criminal justice, education, music, science, and technology. The university is one of the few public universities in the United States to offer accredited undergraduate degrees in meteorology, sound recording technology, nuclear engineering and plastics engineering. It was the first to offer a degree in music education. Academically, UMass Lowell is organized into six schools and colleges: the College of Fine Arts, Humanities and Social Sciences; the College of Education; the Kennedy College of Sciences; the Francis College of Engineering; the Manning School of Business; and the Zuckerberg College of Health Sciences.

History

The University of Massachusetts Lowell owes its origins to two institutions founded in the 1890s: Lowell State College on the south side of the Merrimack River and Lowell Technological Institute on the north side. Each would follow its own path of expansion through the 20th century.

Lowell State College
Lowell State College got its start as the Lowell Normal School, which was chartered in 1894 as a teacher-training institution for women. The 10th and final normal school to be established in Massachusetts, it opened in 1898 with 108 students and five faculty members. The original classroom building opened the next year at the corner of Broadway and Wilder streets, and quickly became a landmark in the city. Designed by local firm Stickney & Austin, it reflects the fashion of the time: high-style Beaux Arts with classical symmetry, arches, cast-iron lampposts and yellow brick. Its design was influenced in part by Lowell High School, which was also designed by Lowell native Frederick W. Stickney. Frank Coburn, for whom the hall was later named, served as the school's first principal until 1908.

After being threatened with closure during the Great Depression, school administrators rallied local support to help keep it open. A delegation of prominent individuals representing Lowell's powerful interest groups traveled to Boston and convinced state officials of the school's importance. The result was that the school not only survived, but continued to grow and expand. In 1950, Dr. Daniel O'Leary assumed the presidency and initiated an ambitious building program. The physical plant of the campus expanded during post-war era from a single structure to a multi-building complex, forming an area now known as UMass Lowell's South Campus.

As the demand for more qualified teachers grew, the legislature reorganized the Normal School into Lowell State College in 1960 with a curriculum that expanded beyond education to include baccalaureate degrees in other fields including nursing and music. Beginning in 1967, the college was authorized to confer two more degrees: Master of Education and Master of Music Education.

Lowell Technological Institute

Established in 1895 as the Lowell Textile School, the institution was founded to train technicians and managers for work in Lowell's booming textile industry. Modeled after the now-defunct Polytechnic College of Pennsylvania, Lowell Textile was the combined effort of the Commonwealth of Massachusetts and corporations eager to form a school dedicated to textile education. Under the guidance of founder James T. Smith, Lowell Textile opened its doors in February 1897 in the upper floors of a downtown commercial block located on Middle Street. The school offered three-year training programs in cotton and wool manufacturing, design, textile chemistry and dyeing.

In 1903, the school moved from downtown to its permanent location just northwest of the Merrimack River. The yellow brick mill-like Southwick Hall was dedicated to Royal and Dierexa Southwick. Grandparents of the wealthy businessman Frederick Ayer, the Southwicks were Quakers and abolitionists who came to Lowell in the 1820s to help establish the Lowell Carpet Company. Ten years later, the school granted its first bachelor's degrees in textile dyeing and textile engineering.

In 1953, President Martin Lydon expanded the curriculum to include programs in plastics, leather, paper and electronics technology, increased the liberal arts offerings and renamed the school the Lowell Technological Institute. He moved the institute decisively toward general engineering, setting up a bachelor's program in 1956. The textile program was closed in 1971, reflecting the closure of most of the mills in the city.

University of Lowell
In 1972, a feasibility study was conducted on merging Lowell State College with Lowell Technological Institute. Lowell State and Lowell Tech merged in 1975 as the University of Lowell.  Durgin Hall, with its 1000-seat performance venue, was dedicated as the home of the Music Department.  The Manning School of Business (then the College of Management Science) was accredited.  The College of Education became certified to offer a doctorate in education (Ed.D.).  The College of Health Professions (now the Zuckerberg College of Health Sciences) was established.   Enrollment increased 58% by 1985.

Merger with University of Massachusetts 
In 1991, the Lowell campus joined the University of Massachusetts system under its current name. Under Chapter 142, the UMass system was restructured to combine the Amherst, Boston, and Worcester campuses with the University of Lowell and Southeastern Massachusetts University (now UMass Dartmouth).

Recent developments 
In 2019, a sexual harassment complaint against Associate Dean Oliver Ibe was settled by the university. The complaint was from a younger female staff member in 2017. Ibe's title of associate dean was removed and he returned to the faculty despite a petition from faculty and staff to have him removed from the campus. He retired the following year.

Campus 
UMass Lowell is the second-largest campus in the University of Massachusetts system and it has three campus clusters: North, South and East. The university's main facilities are located in Lowell, Massachusetts, 25 miles (40 km) northwest of Boston on both sides of the Merrimack River. The university has increased student housing by more than 2,500 beds in the last five years, including opening three new residence halls in 2013, 2015, and 2017.

Organization and administration 
The university is governed by a six-member executive cabinet, including and led by the chancellor. The current chancellor is Julie Chen, who was appointed in May 2022. Marty Meehan, former UMass Lowell Chancellor, is currently the president of the entire University of Massachusetts system. He assumed office in July 2015 after serving as the chancellor since September 2007.

Academics 
The University of Massachusetts Lowell has an acceptance rate of 72 percent, a freshman retention rate of 85 percent, and a graduation rate of 63 percent. In 2016, 87% of first-year students rated their overall educational experience as "good" or "excellent". The average combined SAT score (Critical Reading and Math) for incoming freshmen for fall 2018 was 1233, up nearly 150 points since fall 2010, and the average entering GPA was a 3.60, up from 3.18 in fall 2010. 47% of undergraduate classes had 20 students or fewer in the fall 2018 semester. In 2018 UMass awarded a total of 2,798 Bachelor's, 1,102 Master's and 122 Doctoral degrees.

Tuition and fees 
The 2018-2019 annual tuition and fees for undergraduates were $15,180 (In State), $26,441 (New England Regional & Proximity) and $32,827 (Out of State). Graduate tuitions were $15,060, $22,871 and $26,840 respectively. As of the 2020–2021 school year the annual tuition and fees for undergraduates students  are as follows, $15,698 (in state), $27,238 (New England/proximity), $33,624 (out of state), and lastly $36,525 (International). Graduate tuitions were $15,210, $23,021, $26,990, and $29,841 respectively.

Online programs 
The university offers various courses online; in 2018, it had a total online-enrollment of 30,932 which was an increase of 7.4% compared to 2017. Total revenue from online classes in 2018 was $39.1 million.

Colleges

Francis College of Engineering 
The Francis College of Engineering is named after James B. Francis, a hydraulic engineer who began his career in Lowell during the Industrial Revolution. The college is home to nearly 150 full-time faculty members and 14 research centers, and is fully accredited by ABET. The college is ranked No. 118 by U.S. News & World Report.

UMass Lowell has a radiation laboratory that provides students with real-world experience in particle physics, nuclear engineering and health physics.

The UMass Lowell Baseball Research Center is associated with the College of Engineering. The facility, first funded in 1998, is the official testing center for Major League Baseball, testing bats and baseballs. Those conducting research through the center include mechanical engineering faculty and a full-time staff engineer, and six to 12 student laboratory assistants.

Zuckerberg College of Health Sciences
The Roy J. Zuckerberg College of Health Sciences includes the Solomont School of Nursing, elevated from a department as of June 1, 2013.

The college has more than 2,100 undergraduate students, 409 graduate students, 82 faculty members and six research centers. The college offers seven degree and certificate programs, including the only doctorate of physical therapy (DPT) degree program offered by a public institution in Massachusetts. It also offers the only graduate degrees in pharmaceutical sciences at a public institution in the Commonwealth. The graduate nursing program is ranked No. 156 in the nation while the graduate physical therapy program is ranked No. 101, according to U.S. News & World Report.

College of Fine Arts, Humanities and Social Sciences
The College of Fine Arts, Humanities and Social Sciences includes the School of Criminology and Justice Studies, as well as signature programs including sound recording technology, music business, peace and conflict studies, security studies and more. The College of Fine Arts, Humanities and Social Sciences is the largest college at UMass Lowell and offers 24 undergraduate and graduate degree programs and houses seven centers and institutes, including the Kerouac Center for Public Humanities, named for writer Jack Kerouac, a Lowell native.

School of Education
The School of Education offers bachelor's, master's and doctoral degree programs. The school includes 13 tenure-track faculty members and four clinical faculty members. The school has a 100 percent pass rate on the Massachusetts Tests for Educator Licensure. The online graduate education program is ranked No. 16 in the nation by U.S. News & World Report.

William J. and John F. Kennedy College of Sciences 
The William J. and John F. Kennedy College of Sciences has six departments: Biological Sciences; Chemistry; Computer Science; Environmental, Earth and Atmospheric Sciences; Mathematical Sciences; and Physics and Applied Physics. Originally the UMass Lowell College of Sciences, the college was renamed in honor of two alumni, John F. Kennedy '70 and William J. Kennedy '54, in 2015 (unrelated to the political family).

Research centers associated with the college include the New England Robotics Validation and Testing Center (NERVE), one of the nation's premier robotics research, testing and training facilities. Computer Science professor and NERVE director Holly Yanco is currently collaborating with Northeastern University professors Taskin Padir and Robert Platt in developing NASA's Valkyrie robot to research advancements in cutting-edge humanoid robotics.

The graduate chemistry program is ranked No. 145 and the graduate physics program is ranked No. 124 in the nation by U.S. News & World Report.

Manning School of Business 
The Manning School of Business is named after Robert J. Manning, the chairman and CEO of MFS Investment Management. The school was named after Manning, a 1984 graduate of UMass Lowell, after he and his wife donated $5 million to the university.

The Manning School of Business consists of five departments: Accounting, Finance, Management, MEI (Marketing, Entrepreneurship, and Innovation), and OIS (Operations and Information Systems). The school offers Bachelor's, Master's, and PhD level degrees.

Research 

Total R&D expenditure was $92.2 million in 2020. Many of the research and development opportunities include Working in a campus research lab, helping a community organization, conducting reviews of program-related scholarship, or working on a business or marketing plan for a local start-up. Research can be done on anything, whether it is testing composite materials to advancing cyber security.

Labs and Research Initiatives 

 Advanced Biophotonics Laboratory
 Advanced Composites Materials & Textile Research  
 Advanced Computation and Telecommunications
 Advanced Computing & Networking Systems
 Advanced Electronics Technology
 Astronomical Observatory
 Baseball Research
 Biomanufacturing Science & Technology
 Cancer Treatment, Tissue Regeneration
 Children & Families
 Combustion Lab
 Computer Machine/Human Intelligence, Networking & Distributed Systems
 Data Analytics
 Emerging Technologies to Protect SOLDIERS  
 Geotechnical Engineering
 Health Assessment  
 Human-Robot Interaction
 Materials Characterization
 Medical Device Development
 Medical Physics
 Nanomanufacturing Center
 Neuroscience
 Nuclear Physics
 Nuclear Security & Safeguards
 Peace & Conflict Studies Institute
 Photonics, Electromagnetics & Nanoelectronics
 Printed Electronics
 Protective Fabrics
 Structural Dynamics & Acoustic Systems
 Submillimeter-Wave Technology
 Sustainable Production
 Toxics Use Reduction Institute

Research Centers 

 Center for Advanced Manufacturing of Polymers and Soft Materials
 Center for Advanced Materials
 Center for Asian American Studies
 Center for Population Health
 Center for Program Evaluation
 Center for the Promotion of Health in the New England Workplace
 Center for Terrorism & Security Studies (CTSS), founded by James J.F. Forest in 2013 and former co-publisher of academic journal Perspectives on Terrorism
 Center for Wind Energy
 Center for Women & Work
 Climate Change Initiative
 Lowell Center for Space Science & Technology
 New England Robotics Validation & Experimentation Center
 Raytheon-UMass Lowell Research Institute
Saab Center for Portuguese Studies

Engagement Centers 

 Center for Community Research and Engagement
 Center for Public Opinion
 Stella and Jack Kerouac Center for the Public Humanities
 Tsongas Industrial History Center

Seed Centers 

 Biomedical Terahertz Technology Center
 Center for Autism Research and Education (CARE)
 Center for Gerontology Research & Partnerships
 Center for International Security & Forensics Education & Research
 Massachusetts BioManufacturing Center
 Radiation Laboratory

University rankings 

U.S. News & World Report ranks UMass Lowell No. 176 on its National Universities list in the Best Colleges of 2021. U.S. News & World Report also named UMass Lowell No. 87 in the top public universities and second among public universities in Massachusetts. Washington Monthly ranked UMass Lowell No. 163 nationally for 2015, representing a 31-spot jump from 2013. Forbes ranked UMass Lowell No. 175 among research universities and No. 408 overall. University Ranking by Academic Performance for 2019-2020 ranks the university as No. 197 in the country. UMass Lowell is accredited by the New England Commission of Higher Education.

UMass Lowell is known for having one of the highest returns on investment (ROI) in the country for its graduates. Forbes ranked UMass Lowell as the 10th best value among all universities and colleges nationwide for 2013 and fourth-best value among non-military academies. UMass Lowell is one of just 75 institutions in the nation whose graduates have a 30-year net ROI of more than $1 million. PayScale.com found that UMass Lowell provides the 10th best ROI among 437 public universities in the U.S. and 50th out of 1,060 colleges and universities for 2013. PayScale also ranked UMass Lowell 40th in the Northeast Region for highest mid-career salary among graduates of state universities ($95,100) and 80th overall (tied with Boston College).

UMass Lowell has been listed as one of the most underrated colleges in America on multiple occasions. In 2013, Business Insider named UMass Lowell as the "Most Underrated College in America". The 2015 edition has named UMass Lowell as the second-most underrated college in the U.S. behind NJIT.

Student life

Student body 
Total enrollment for the 2019–2020 academic year is 18,338, including 2,481 students in online and continuing education. in the following academic year about 18,400 students enrolled in the university this fall, making the largest student body enrolled.

In-state enrollment represents 88.3 percent of undergraduates and 58.4 percent of graduate students. International students make up 3.5 percent of the undergraduate population and 16.2 percent of the graduate population. Students of color represent 36 percent of the total undergraduate population and 25 percent of the graduate population. The male-female ratio for undergraduates in 2018 was 61/39. Total enrollment has increased 50 percent since 2007.

Student activities

UMass Lowell has more than 250 student-run organizations. Of those, the seven largest are funded directly from the student activities fee (other registered student organizations have budgets granted through the Student Government Association). They are:

Student Government Association (SGA)
The UMass Lowell Connector (student newspaper)
WUML (student-run radio station)
Association for Campus Events (ACE)
Off-Broadway Players (student theater group)
University of Massachusetts Lowell River Hawk Marching Band
Greek Council (student-run Governing Body of Greek Life Organizations)
Disable the Label (UML)

Greek life
Greek life was banned from the university campus after a hazing in 1987, where a student suffered overheating when left with a sleeping bag over his head near a space heater. Greek life was returned to the campus in 2012.

Fraternities

 Omicron Pi (local fraternity)
Phi Kappa Sigma
Sigma Tau Gamma
Sigma Phi Omicron (local fraternity)
Sigma Beta Rho
Delta Kappa Phi (local fraternity)

Sororities
Alpha Sigma Tau
Alpha Omega (local sorority)
Kappa Delta Phi NAS
Phi Sigma Rho (local sorority)

Athletics

UMass Lowell athletic teams compete in a variety of men's and women's sports in Division I. Men's sports include baseball, basketball, cross country, ice hockey, lacrosse, track and field, and soccer. Women's sports are basketball, cross country, lacrosse, track and field, field hockey, soccer, and softball. As of July 1, 2013, 14 of UMass Lowell's Division II teams moved up to Division I, joining the America East Conference. The River Hawks, with the exception of men's ice hockey, previously competed in the Northeast-10 Conference at the Division II level. Past champions include the 1988 men's basketball team, the 1991 men's cross country team, the men's ice hockey team (three times) and the field hockey team twice (2005, 2010). The 2010 field hockey team finished its season with a perfect 24–0 record.

The university's men's ice hockey team plays in the Hockey East Association and plays its home games at the Tsongas Center at UMass Lowell. In 2013, the men's hockey team won the Hockey East regular-season and tournament championships and advanced to the NCAA Division I Championship "Frozen Four," all for the first time in the university's history. The men's hockey team repeated as Hockey East champions in 2014 while advancing to the NCAA Division I Men's Ice Hockey Championship for the third straight year and sixth time overall. Goalie Connor Hellebuyck is the only Hockey East player to receive the league tournament's Most Valuable Player Award in two consecutive years, earning the honor in 2013 and 2014.

The nickname "River Hawks" came about during the school's transition from the University of Lowell to UMass Lowell and was inspired by the campus's location along the Merrimack River.  The University of Lowell's nickname was the Chiefs, which was abandoned in favor of the current name. A campus-wide poll was conducted for student input and final candidates included the Ospreys and the Raging Rapids, according to the Connector student newspaper.

Alumni and notable people

Alumni activity 

In 2018, a total of 8,158 alumni were supporting UMass Lowell financially, representing 10.2% of the alumni body.

Notable alumni and others 

Notable people associated with the university include:

See also
Music at the University of Massachusetts Lowell

References

External links

UMass Lowell Athletics website

 
Lowell
University of Massachusetts Lowell
University of Massachusetts Lowell
Educational institutions established in 1975
Universities and colleges in Middlesex County, Massachusetts
Tourist attractions in Lowell, Massachusetts
Universities and colleges formed by merger in the United States